Polemonium eddyense is a perennial wildflower species in the family Polemoniaceae with the common name Mount Eddy sky pilot. It is endemic to a small area around Mount Eddy, California.

Description
Polemonium eddyense is a small herb with a dense tuft of highly divided hairy leaves. The flowers are held in a tight cluster above the foliage and each flower has 5 symmetric petals and is blue with a yellow center and has prominent yellow anthers.

Range and habitat
Polemonium eddyense is endangered and is found growing on and near Mount Eddy in California on rocky serpentine soils.

References

eddyense
Endemic flora of California
NatureServe critically imperiled species